Sir Ernest Salter Wills, 3rd Baronet of Hazelwood & Clapton in-Gordano, Laird of Meggernie Castle  CStJ JP (30 November 1869 – 14 January 1958) was Lord Lieutenant of Wiltshire from 1930 to 1942. He played tennis at Wimbledon in the early 1900s.

Life
The son of Sir Edward Payson Wills, 1st Baronet, KCB, JP and of Lady Wills (she was Mary Ann, elder daughter of J. Chaning Pearce MRCS, FGS, of Montagu House, Bath), Wills was born in 1869.  He was educated at Monkton Combe School, just outside Bath in Somerset from 1884 to 1885.  He succeeded his elder brother in the baronetcy in 1921.

The Wills family were part owners of W. D. & H. O. Wills, tobacco importers and cigarette manufacturers, which had been founded by Wills's great grandfather, Henry Overton Wills I, JP, in 1786, and later became part of Imperial Tobacco. Wills was a cousin of Gilbert Wills, 1st Baron Dulverton, Sir George Alfred Wills, Baronet of Blagdon, and a nephew of Henry Overton Wills III, Sir Frederick Wills Bt & Sir Frank William Wills Kt.

In 1894, Wills married Caroline Fanny Maud, daughter of William Augustine de Winton, of Westbury Lodge, Durdham Down, Bristol, later appointed DStJ, and they had two sons and three daughters.

 Doris Maud de Winton-Wills (9 August 1896 – 29 September 1968) married (14 June 1920) Norman Carl Haag, HM's Consul-General at Basel, Switzerland
 Margaret Joyce de Winton-Wills (21 June 1898 – 10 October 1976) married (10 June 1918) Thomas Trevor Kyffin, son of Dr John Kyffin
 Barbara Joan de Winton-Wills (23 February 1902) married (28 October 1925) Lt.-Col. Thomas Ansell Fairhurst, MA (Cantab.) JP, Lord of the Manor of Arlington
 Lt.-Col. Sir Ernest Edward de Winton-Wills, 4th Baronet of Hazelwood, Laird of Meggernie Castle, Scots Guards (8 December 1903 – August 1983) married 1. (26 January 1926) Sylvia Margaret Ogden at St Margaret's Westminster. He married 2. (29 June 1949) Juliet Eve Graham-Clarke at Gloucester Cathedral
 Major George Seton Wills, TD (18 May 1911 – 4 February 1979) married (30 October 1935) Lilah Mary Hare, daughter of Captain Percy Richard Hare

Wills owned substantial properties in England and Scotland: Clapton Court, Somerset; Ramsbury Manor and Littlecote House (the family seat) in Wiltshire; and Meggernie Castle in Perthshire. He also owned the Château de l'oiseau bleu at Menton on the French Riviera. He was a director of Imperial Tobacco and of the Portishead District Water Company.

He was succeeded in the title by his elder son, Lieutenant-Colonel Ernest Edward de Winton Wills, Scots Guards, whose grandson is David Brudenell-Bruce, Earl of Cardigan.

References
WILLS, Sir Ernest (Salter) 3rd Bt in Who Was Who 1897-2007 (London, A. & C. Black)
Sir Ernest Wills, 3rd Baronet at cox.net
Sir Ernest Wills, 3rd Baronet at ghgraham.org
Sir Ernest Salter Wills, 3rd Baronet of Hazelwood, in Burke's Peerage and Baronetage
Sir Ernest Wills, 3rd Baronet of Hazelwood, in Debrett's Peerage and Baronetage
Sir Ernest Wills, 3rd Baronet of Hazelwood, at www.broadhurst-family.co.uk
Family of Sir Ernest Wills, 3rd Baronet of Hazelwood, at www.hungerfordvirtualmuseum.co.uk

1869 births
People educated at Monkton Combe School
1958 deaths
Baronets in the Baronetage of the United Kingdom
Lord-Lieutenants of Wiltshire
English justices of the peace
British male tennis players
English male tennis players
Ernest